During World War II, Germanische Leitstelle was a department of the SS-Hauptamt under the command of Obergruppenführer Gottlob Berger. It oversaw the recruitment and propaganda offices for the Waffen SS in Oslo, Copenhagen, Brussels and The Hague.

The Germanische Leitstelle in Norway
The Oslo office was established in 1941 and led by Karl Leib, the son-in-law of Gottlob Berger. It was headquartered in Drammensveien 99 until 1943, when it moved to Colbjørnsens gate 1. 

The Germanische Leitstelle published the Germanic Messenger (Germansk Budstikke) and SS-Heftet, which was the Norwegian edition of SS-Leitheft.

References

Nazi SS
Norway in World War II